

The children of Joseph Smith Jr., the founder of the Latter Day Saint movement, and his wife Emma Smith, are historically significant because of their roles in establishing and leading the Latter Day Saint Movement, which includes the Church of Jesus Christ of Latter-day Saints (LDS Church), the Reorganized Church of Jesus Christ of Latter Day Saints (RLDS Church, since 2001 called Community of Christ), The Church of Jesus Christ (Bickertonite), the Church of Christ (Temple Lot) and several other sects.  Some Latter Day Saint sects, including the RLDS, believed that leadership of the church would follow lineal succession of Smith's descendants. In 1860, Joseph Smith III became the prophet and president of the RLDS Church, succeeded by his sons. The Community of Christ no longer holds to this practice. The larger LDS Church did not follow the practice, and it was led after Joseph Smith's death by Brigham Young.

Joseph Smith taught the doctrine of plural marriage as found in the Old Testament but also publicly condemned polygamy not under the laws of God. There is evidence that Smith both taught and practiced it, and had a number of wives sealed to him. Several women later testified that they were wives in the full sense of the word.  Emily D. P.  Partidge said she 'roomed' with him, and Melissa Lott Willes testified that she was his wife 'in very deed.' Though there were allegations of paternity in some of these polygamous marriages, ongoing genetic research of descendants of these plural marriages has been negative. These are the nine biological children of Emma and Joseph Smith, four of whom survived to adulthood, and the two children they adopted:

Joseph and Emma Hale Smith family

See also 
 List of Joseph Smith's wives#Allegations of children born to polygamous wives
 Community of Christ
 :Category:Lists of children by person

Notes

 
Joseph Smith
Latter Day Saint movement lists
Mormonism-related controversies
Mormonism and polygamy
Children